The 2018–19 Ball State Cardinals men's basketball team represented Ball State University during the 2018–19 NCAA Division I men's basketball season. The Cardinals, led by sixth-year head coach James Whitford, played their home games at Worthen Arena as members of the West Division of the Mid-American Conference. They finished the season 16–17, 6–12 in MAC play to finish in fifth place in the West Division. They defeated Eastern Michigan in the first round of the MAC tournament before losing in the quarterfinals to Bowling Green.

Previous season
The Cardinals finished the 2017–18 season 19–13, 10–8 to finish in third place in the MAC West division. They lost in the quarterfinals of the MAC tournament to Kent State.

Offseason

Departures

Incoming Transfers

Recruiting class of 2018

Recruiting class of 2019

Roster

Schedule and results

|-
!colspan=9 style=| Exhibition

|-
!colspan=9 style=| Non-conference regular season

|-
!colspan=9 style=| MAC regular season

|-
!colspan=9 style=| MAC tournament

See also
 2018–19 Ball State Cardinals women's basketball team

References

Ball State
Ball State Cardinals men's basketball seasons
Ball State
Ball State